Easy Star All-Stars is a reggae collective founded in 1997 by Michael Goldwasser, Eric Smith, Lem Oppenheimer and Remy Gerstein of New York City-based Easy Star Records. The band is known for its reinterpretations of classic albums in reggae style. Their first album, released in 2003, was Dub Side of the Moon, an interpretation of Pink Floyd's 1973 album Dark Side of the Moon. This was followed by Radiodread (2006), an interpretation of Radiohead's 1997 album OK Computer; Easy Star's Lonely Hearts Dub Band (2009), an interpretation the Beatles' 1967 album Sgt. Pepper's Lonely Hearts Club Band; and Easy Star's Thrillah (2012), an interpretation of Michael Jackson's 1982 album Thriller.

History

Founding, covers
They originally formed as a studio band for the label's earliest recordings. Although they have backed many artists  and produced several original releases, they are best known for covering popular albums in a reggae and dub style and have released four cover albums to date.

First  albums
In February 2003, Easy Star All-Stars released a cover album of Pink Floyd's The Dark Side of the Moon entitled Dub Side of the Moon, a complete reggae reinterpretation of the Pink Floyd album. Dub Side of the Moon has remained on the Billboard Reggae Charts since its release in 2003. It features instructions on how to synchronize the record with The Wizard of Oz, referencing the audiovisual pairing sometimes referred to as Dark Side of the Rainbow.

Dub Side of the Moon was followed by the 2006 release of Radiodread, a reimagining of Radiohead's album OK Computer.  At a 2006 Radiohead concert, Thom Yorke praised Toots & The Maytals version of "Let Down" on Radiodread. Radiohead guitarist Jonny Greenwood has also praised the cover version, calling it "truly astounding."

In March 2008, Easy Star All-Stars released Until that Day, an EP consisting of original material except for "Dubbing Up the Walls", a cover of the Radiohead song "Climbing Up the Walls." On 5 April 2011, they released their first original album entitled First Light. The only constant member of the band is Michael Goldwasser.

On January 13, 2009 the Easy Star All-Stars posted a statement on their website that they had completed their next album, a reworking of Sgt. Pepper's Lonely Hearts Club Band by The Beatles titled Easy Star's Lonely Hearts Dub Band, which was released on April 14, 2009. However it was exclusively released on imeem a day prior. Reviews have been favourable. Sydney street press Music Feeds rated the album 10/10. Easy Star's Lonely Hearts Dub Band cracked the Billboard Top 200 twice, making it the first reggae album to do so in over two years.

Victor Axelrod aka Ticklah compiled a dub version of a song by the Iowa reggae band Public Property on an upcoming album Work to Do set for release in July 2009.

Michael Goldwasser compiled a dub version of the song "Turn & Run" by Umphrey's McGee.

Recent years
In October 2010, the Easy Star All-Stars released Dubber Side of the Moon, featuring bass-heavy remixes of Dub Side of the Moon by Dubmatix, 10 Ft. Ganja Plant, Groove Corporation, Dubphonic, The Alchemist, Dreadzone, Kalbata, Adrian Sherwood & Jazzwad, Victor Rice, Border Crossing, Mad Professor, Michael G. & Easy Star All-Stars, and J. Viewz.

On August 28, 2012, the Easy Star All-Stars released Thrillah, a reimagining of Michael Jackson's album Thriller. On August 12, 2016, the Easy Star All-Stars rereleased their 2006 album Radiodread. The Easy Star All-Stars' rerelease contains a bonus track featuring Morgan Heritage covering Radiohead's song "High and Dry" from their 1995 album The Bends. On September 16, 2014, the Easy Star All-Stars released a special anniversary re-issue of Dub Side of the Moon, their 2003 album reinterpreting Pink Floyd's Dark Side of the Moon.

In recent years, Easy Star All-Stars' producer Michael Goldwasser has worked on a handful of reggae remixes with chart-topping artists, including the tracks "Have It All" by Jason Mraz, "I Like That" by Janelle Monáe, and "Heat" by Kelly Clarkson.

Current line-up
Listed in the order and as they appear in the liner notes accompanying Dub Side of the Moon:
 Michael Goldwasser
 Victor Axelrod aka Ticklah
 Patrick Dougher
 Victor Rice

The core of the touring line-up has remained largely intact since 2003. The rotating roster includes:

 Buford O'Sullivan (trombone)
 Cliff Simpson (drums)
 Elenna Canlas (keyboards, vocals)
 Ive-09 (drums)
 Jenny Hill (saxophone, flute)
 Jared Yee (saxophone)
 Joanne Williams (vocals)
 Kirsty Rock (vocals)
 Ras I Ray (bass, vocals)
 Ruff Scott (DJ vocals)
 Shelton Garner, Jr. (guitar, vocals)

Discography
Dub Side of the Moon - (2003)
Radiodread - (2006)
Until that Day EP - (2008)
Easy Star's Lonely Hearts Dub Band - (2009)
Dubber Side of the Moon - (2010)
First Light - (2011)
Easy Star's Thrillah - (2012)

References

External links

Easy Star Records
Myspace Blog
Easy Star All-Stars, Camden Koko (28/04/2009) Live Review at DailyMusicGuide.com

Easy Star All-Stars|Cover band musical groups
Jamaican reggae musical groups
Easy Star Records artists
Musical groups established in 1997